Jabez Bunting (13 May 1779 – 16 June 1858) was an English Wesleyan Methodist leader and the most prominent Methodist after John Wesley's death in 1791. 

Bunting began as a revivalist but became dedicated to church order and discipline. He was a popular preacher in numerous cities. He held numerous senior positions as administrator and watched budgets closely. Bunting and his allies centralised power by making the conference the final arbiter of Methodism, and giving it the power to reassign preachers and select superintendents. He was particularly zealous in the cause of foreign missions. Politically, he was conservative, as were most Methodist leaders of the time.

Early life
Born of humble parentage at Manchester in 1779, Bunting was educated at Manchester Grammar School. He had been converted at the age of twelve under the ministry of the Wesleyan Joseph Benson, and, at the age of nineteen, began to preach among the revivalists. He was still a practising revivalist as late as 1802. At Macclesfield, he saw revivals leading to dissension and division, and his views changed fundamentally. From this time onwards Bunting was a exponent of church order and discipline, and an implacable opponent of revivalism.

Ministry
Bunting was "received into full Connexion" (that is, became an ordained minister) in 1803. He continued to minister for upwards of 57 years in Manchester, Sheffield, Leeds, Liverpool, London and elsewhere. Bunting was a popular preacher and an effective platform speaker; in 1818 he was given the degree of M.A. by the University of Aberdeen, and in 1834 that of D.D. (doctorate) by Wesleyan University of Middletown, Connecticut, United States. He identified as an Evangelical Arminian.

Leadership
Bunting was able to wield authority by occupying several important offices within the Connexion. Most significantly, he was four times chosen to be president of the Conference (heading the ruling body of the Wesleyan Methodist Connexion) in 1820, 1828, 1836 and 1844. He repeatedly served as secretary of the Legal Hundred (secretary of the conference). He was also secretary to the Wesleyan Missionary Society for eighteen years, having succeeded Richard Watson. 

In 1835, he was appointed president of the first Wesleyan theological college (at Hoxton), and in this position he succeeded in materially raising the standard of education among Wesleyan ministers.

Under his leadership, Methodism ceased to be tied to the established Church of England and became wholly separate. Vickers (2008) states that Bunting was "the epitome of 'high Methodism', which stressed the Connexion, the national, the international (including foreign missions)." He was satirized in Wesleyan Undertakings – a collection of critical sketches of Methodist leaders published in 1840 – which depicted him as intolerably autocratic, "a monster of greatness". Bunting defended the supremacy of conference, stating: "Methodism hates democracy as it hates sin". 

As well as detractors, Bunting also had supporters. Urlin (1901) wrote an appraisal:
"His figure was hardly impressive, he was of middle size, portly, looking like a mayor. The charm was in the voice, which once heard could not easily be forgotten. It had a ring of authority and decision, though not of harshness, and it was at the same time flexible and persuasive… His fame was based rather on his abilities as a tactician and organiser, in short, he had the qualities of a statesman; and he did for Methodism what Bishop S. Wilberforce did for the Anglican Church."

Politically, Bunting was a conservative and Tory. As President of the Conference, he supported the transportation of the Tolpuddle martyrs despite the fact that they were closely linked to Methodism, their leaders being local preachers. He did, however, champion liberal causes such as religious liberty and he supported Catholic Emancipation in 1829.

Under Bunting's presidency in 1820 the Resolutions on Pastoral Work or Liverpool Minutes were adopted by the conference in Liverpool. The resolutions encouraged class meetings and catechesis, and set out the working principles by which the Methodist leaders present at the conference sought "to cultivate more fully the spirit of Christian pastors". They were revised by conference in 1885. Methodist researcher Andrew Stobart states that the resolutions were adopted at a time of crisis when the recently established Wesleyan Methodist Connexion was struggling to maintain membership numbers in its early years: the movement had recorded a net loss of 4,688 members during the previous year.

Bunting's policies provoked opposition leading to the secession of the Protestant Methodists and Wesleyan Methodist Association, in 1828 and 1838 respectively. In 1849, the Wesleyan Reform movement broke away from the Wesleyan Connexion following the expulsion of James Everett, William Griffith and Samuel Dunn, critics of Bunting's leadership, from the Wesleyan Connexion's Manchester Conference.  Numerous alliances with other groups failed and weakened his control.

Family
He was twice married and had three sons. His eldest son, William Maclardie Bunting (1805–1866), was also a distinguished Wesleyan minister and minor hymn writer. A younger son, Thomas Percival Bunting (1811–1886), was his biographer. His grandson Sir Percy William Bunting (1836–1911), son of T. P. Bunting, was a prominent liberal nonconformist and editor of the Contemporary Review. His granddaughter Sarah Amos (1841–1908), a daughter of T. P. Bunting, was a liberal political activist.

Death and commemoration
He died in 1858 and was interred in Wesley's Chapel. In 1986 a plaque was placed on his home at 30 Myddelton Square, London.

References

Further reading
 Bunting, T. P. & Rowe, G. S. The Life of Jabez Bunting, DD (1887)
 Karl, J. H. S. "The Interpretation of Jabez Bunting", Proceedings of the Wesley Historical Society (1958) 31#6 pp 125–132' (1958) 31#7 pp 150–154 and (1959) 32#1 pp 13–17.
 Ward, W. R. "Bunting, Jabez (1779–1858)", Oxford Dictionary of National Biography, Oxford University Press, 2004; online edn, Oct 2007 accessed 1 Oct 2016 doi:10.1093/ref:odnb/3947

Primary sources
 Hayes, Alan & David Gowland (eds). Scottish Methodism in the Early Victorian period: The Scottish Correspondence of the Rev. Jabez Bunting, 1800–1857 (1981).

External links
c1845 photo

1779 births
1858 deaths
Clergy from Manchester
People educated at Manchester Grammar School
English Methodist ministers
19th-century Methodist ministers
Presidents of the Methodist Conference
Burials at Wesley's Chapel